Madan Mitra (born 3 December 1954) is an Indian politician from West Bengal. Madan Mitra started his career with party Indian National Congress.  He held many positions of Indian Youth Congress, the party's youth wing. In 1998, he joined All India Trinamool Congress party, founded by his colleague Mamata Banerjee. In 2011, he was elected to the legislative assembly and became a state minister. He was arrested for the Sarada chit fund conspiracy case and got bail after 22 months.

Early life
Mitra hails from an aristocratic family of Bhowanipore, Kolkata. In 1971, he passed out from South Suburban School. He received an under-graduate degree in history from Calcutta University in 1976.

Political career

Early years
In 1973, Mitra entered politics and became the president of the students' union of Ashutosh College. He later became the south Kolkata president of the Indian Youth Congress. Initially, he belonged to the Priya Ranjan Dasmunsi faction. However, in 1976 he first switched to the Somen Mitra faction and then to the Mamata Banerjee faction. In 1990, he was appointed general secretary of the West Bengal unit of the Indian Youth Congress. He launched a taxi drivers' union the 1990s and also wrested control of the union of the SSKM Hospital.

Mamata Banerjee founded the Trinamool Congress in 1998. In 2000, he was appointed general secretary of the party. Four years later, he became the president of the Trinamool Youth Congress.

Electoral politics
In 2011 West Bengal Legislative Assembly election, Mitra was elected to the Legislative Assembly from the Kamarhati constituency. He became the sports minister and transport minister in the First Mamata Banerjee ministry. On 18 November 2015, he resigned from the cabinet after being named as an accused in the Saradha Group financial scandal.

Mitra lost the 2016 West Bengal Legislative Assembly election from his constituency. He was defeated by Manash Mukherjee of Communist Party of India (Marxist) by a margin of 4,198 votes. Following the defeat, he was relegated to the fringes of the party. On 26 April 2019, Mamata Banerjee announced that Mitra would contest the upcoming by-election for Bhatpara constituency which had become vacant due to the defection of Arjun Singh to the Bharatiya Janata Party, but he was defeated by Pawan Kumar Singh.

Personal life
Madan Mitra is married to Mrs. Archana Mitra. They have two sons, Swarup Mitra and Subhorup Mitra. While Swarup is a businessman, Subhorup is a youth politician. Swarup's son Maharup was born in 2015.

Controversies
In 2012, Mitra questioned the morals of Suzette Jordan, the Park Street rape victim for befriending strangers at 2 am.

On 13 December 2014, Mitra was arrested by the Central Bureau of Investigation for his alleged role in Saradha Group financial scandal. Mamata Banerjee claimed that the arrest was an example of political vendetta of the Bharatiya Janata Party. While in jail, he was admitted to a hospital in November 2015 after he complained of "uneasiness". In September 2016, he was granted bail and hasn't been admitted to the hospital since.

Mitra was interrogated by the Enforcement Directorate in September 2017 following the Narada sting operation.

On 17 May 2021, he along with senior minister in the Mamata Banerjee cabinet, Subrata Mukherjee, MLA and minister Firhad Hakim and former Mayor of Kolkata Sovan Chatterjee has been arrested by Central Bureau of Investigation from their house in connection with the Narada sting operation..He was granted bail on 28 May 2021.

References

External links 

 

State cabinet ministers of West Bengal
Living people
West Bengal MLAs 2011–2016
Trinamool Congress politicians from West Bengal
People from Kamarhati
Indian prisoners and detainees
Corruption in West Bengal
1954 births